The Bradshaw Bunch is an American reality television program on E! featuring four-time NFL Super Bowl champion quarterback Terry Bradshaw and his family. The series premiered on September 17, 2020. It was filmed at Bradshaw's ranch in Thackerville, Oklahoma.

On November 12, 2020, the series was renewed for a second season, which premiered in 2021.

Cast
Terry Bradshaw
Tammy Bradshaw
Rachel Bradshaw
Lacey Hester Bradshaw
Erin Bradshaw Weiss

Episodes

Series overview

Season 1 (2020)

Season 2 (2021–2022)

Special

References

English-language television shows
2020s American reality television series
2020 American television series debuts
E! original programming
Love County, Oklahoma
Television series by Warner Horizon Television
Television series about families
Television shows filmed in Oklahoma
Television shows set in Oklahoma